The following are lists of people who play women's football (soccer).

 List of women's footballers with 100 or more international goals
 List of women's footballers with 100 or more international caps
 List of top international women's football goal scorers by country
 List of English women's football champions
 List of England women's international footballers
 List of foreign FA Women's Super League players
 List of foreign NWSL players
 List of United States women's international soccer players
 List of women's Olympic football tournament records and statistics
 List of goalscoring goalkeepers
 List of association football families

See also 
 List of women's international association football competitions
 List of women's national association football teams
 List of female American football players